Loxocrambus is a genus of moths of the family Crambidae.

Species
Loxocrambus awemensis McDunnough, 1929
Loxocrambus canellus Forbes, 1920
Loxocrambus coloradellus (Fernald, 1893)
Loxocrambus hospition (Błeszyński, 1963)
Loxocrambus mohaviellus Forbes, 1920

References

Crambini
Crambidae genera
Taxa named by William Trowbridge Merrifield Forbes